The Knowledge, Skills, and Abilities (KSA) framework, is a series of narrative statements that, along with résumés, determines who the best applicants are when several candidates qualify for a job. The knowledge, skills, and abilities (KSAs) necessary for the successful performance of a position are contained on each job vacancy announcement. They are:

 Knowledge – the subjects, topics, and items of information that an employee should know at the time he or she is hired or moved into the job.
 Skills – technical or manual proficiencies which are usually learned or acquired through training.
 Abilities – the present demonstrable capacity to apply several knowledge and skills simultaneously in order to complete a task or perform an observable behaviour.

A similar model, the KASE (Knowledge, Attributes, Skills and Experience) framework is used by the careers advisory service at King's College London.

Evaluation of essays 
KSA statements are also known as Evaluation Factors. Other agencies sometimes call them "Rating Factors", "Quality Ranking Factors", "Knowledge, Abilities, skills, and Other Characteristics", or "Job Elements". The name can be just a name but it often influences content and length of the essay. The required length of the KSA statements varies from employer to employer, but the usual length of the KSA factors is between 1/2 to 1½ pages long.

The scoring of KSA essays is often based on a ranking given to each individual essay, and there is often a cutoff score. High scores are derived through answering the KSA question as specifically as possible, providing examples from previous employment or training that clearly demonstrate the applicant meet the qualifications.

Controversies 
In 2009 the US Office of Personal Management asked federal agencies to stop requiring job applicants to fill out the questionnaires, and were phased out within a year of the announcement.

References

United States Office of Personnel Management
Essays